The Battle of Heiligerlee (Heiligerlee, Groningen, 23 May 1568) was fought between Dutch rebels and the Spanish army of Friesland. It was the first Dutch victory during the  Eighty Years' War.

The Groningen province of the Spanish Netherlands was invaded by an army consisting of 3,900 infantry, led by Louis of Nassau, and 200 cavalry, led by Adolf of Nassau. Both of them were brothers of William I of Orange. The intention was to begin an armed uprising against the Spanish rulers of the Netherlands.

The Stadtholder of Friesland and also Duke of Aremberg, Johan de Ligne, had an army of 3,200 infantry and 20 cavalry.

Aremberg initially avoided confrontation and awaited reinforcements from the Count of Meghem. However, on 23 May, Adolf's cavalry lured him to an ambush at the monastery of Heiligerlee. Louis's infantry made up the bulk of the army and defeated the Spanish force which lost 460 men, and the invading force lost 50, including Adolf. The rebels captured seven cannons.

The invading force, however, did not capture any cities and was soon defeated at the Battle of Jemmingen.

The death of Adolf of Nassau is mentioned in the Dutch national anthem (fourth verse):

Graef Adolff is ghebleven, In Vriesland in den slaech,
"Count Adolf stayed behind, in Friesland, in the battle"

Notes

References 
 Dupuy, R. Ernest and Trevor N. Dupuy, The Harper Encyclopedia of Military History, (HarperCollins Publishers, 1993.
 Laffin, John, Brassey's Dictionary of Battles, Barnes & Noble Inc., 1995.
 Menzel, Wolfgang, The history of Germany: from the earliest period to 1842, Vol.2, George Bell & sons, 1908.
https://www.elcaminoespañol.com/la-epoca/232-efemerides-los-holandeses-invanden-holanda-o-la-batalla-de-heiligerlee/

Heiligerlee
1568 in the Habsburg Netherlands
16th-century military history of Spain
Eighty Years' War (1566–1609)
Heiligerlee (1568)
Heiligerlee (1568)
Heiligerlee
Oldambt (municipality)